The 1912 Minnesota gubernatorial election took place on November 5, 1912. Republican Party of Minnesota candidate Adolph Olson Eberhart defeated Democratic Party of Minnesota challenger Peter M. Ringdal.

Republican primary

Background 
In 1909, then-Lieutenant Governor Adolph Eberhart ascended to the governorship after the death of Democratic Governor John A. Johnson. Eberhart entered office during a time of political upheaval in Minnesota.

The Democrats had not won the governorship in Minnesota from 1860 until nearly 1900 when John Lind was elected Governor in 1898 in a union ticket with the People's Party. Since then, Democrats had been able to consolidate significant third-party movements in Minnesota and had won the governorship in 1904, 1906, and 1908 under Governor John A. Johnson whose reforms had won him bipartisan appeal. He was compared to Abraham Lincoln and was hailed as an "idol of the people."

However, Democrats had not successfully consolidated all third parties in Minnesota. The Prohibition Party, formerly allied with the Republicans, was gaining strength in the run up to the passage of the 18th Amendment. Additionally, a Socialist Party popular with Scandinavian immigrants had sprung up on the Iron Range under the name of the Public Ownership Party.

Not only were Republicans contending with a newly strong Democratic Party and insurgent third parties, but also with a significant rebellion from their own voters. Just as such a rift had festered in the presidential election, the divide between progressive Republicans and reactionary Republicans grew to a fever pitch in Minnesota. Progressive Republicans held that reactionary Republicans (like Governor Eberhart) had been using their political machine to hold up popular reforms of the day, like referendums, recall elections, and railroad regulations.

All these factors were amplified by the fact that this was Minnesota's first ever statewide primary in 1912.

Campaign 
Early in 1912, it was speculated that incumbent Senator Knute Nelson would not be running for a third term under a new Minnesota law that provided for the direct election of United States Senators. Governor Eberhart reportedly dashed his plans of running for reelection and was planning on running for Nelson's seat. Days later, however, Eberhart announced his plans to run for reelection on January 12 after Nelson announced his run for the Senate.

Three days later, former Speaker of the Minnesota House William E. Lee and Lieutenant Governor Sam Y. Gordon threw their hats in the ring. At an event in Browns Valley, Gordon characterized his run for Governor "as a challenge of the right of... [business] interests to dominate public affairs, and to dictate party policies."

In early February, Lewis C. Spooner, a more traditional Republican, was reportedly encouraging Edwin H. Canfield, a former State Senator from Luverne, to run for Governor and take votes from Eberhart. Canfield declined, which forced Spooner into the race by April.

Starting in May, non-binding Republican county conventions showed deep distaste for the incumbent governor. At the first convention in Kandiyohi County, Eberhart did not carry a single precinct.

After the passage of the bill calling for Minnesota's first statewide primary, Edward Young, of Appleton, announced his candidacy for the governorship in late June. In early July, a political newcomer by the name of Martin Falk jumped into the race. He was considered so obscure that the Duluth Herald remarked that he would "very likely never be Governor of Minnesota."

By late July, a rift had formed between the serious candidates. After the contentious 1912 Republican National Convention, Gordon announced that he would not support William Taft's candidacy and would support Teddy Roosevelt's bid instead. Eberhart and Spooner vowed to support the party's choice of Taft. This, coupled with the announcement that the primary would be ranked-choice, inspired Eberhart's campaign to publish a paper denouncing Lee, Gordon, and Young, but leaving critiques of Spooner out, thus offering Spooner a tacit endorsement for second choice. Later, Young announced that he would support Democrat Woodrow Wilson in the presidential election.

The 1912 harvest season was especially strong in Minnesota, which left farmers too busy to attend political rallies. The candidates all abandoned their speaking tours for weeks during August as no one could rally enough support to fill a hall. One farmer remarked "My wheat means more to me than who is going to be elected."

In late August, as the primary date approached, progressive Republicans worried that their candidates were splitting the anti-Eberhart vote. They had hoped the second-choice provision on ballots would save them, but voters were increasingly skeptical of the option. Notably, Gordon's campaign manager quit and Gordon nearly dropped out.

The final days of the campaign were marked with controversy over the second-choice provision and endorsements from various groups and politicians. The Duluth Herald proclaimed the coming primary to be the "Last Stand of [the] Republican Machine."

Candidates

Nominated 
Adolph Olson Eberhart, incumbent Governor of Minnesota, former Lieutenant Governor and State Senator

Eliminated in Primary 

 William E. Lee, former Speaker of the Minnesota House of Representatives
Edward T. Young, former Minnesota Attorney General, State Senator, State Representative, Appleton City Attorney, and Appleton City Councilor
 Lewis C. Spooner, State Representative
Samuel Y. Gordon, incumbent Lieutenant Governor
 Martin F. Falk

Withdrawn 

 Edgar Weaver, County Auditor of Blue Earth County

Declined 

 Samuel Lord, member of Minnesota Board of Taxation
 Edwin H. Canfield, former State Senator
 Ripley B. Brower, former State Senator
 Samuel G. Iverson, State Auditor
 Robert C. Dunn, State Representative, former Republican gubernatorial nominee, former State Auditor, former County Attorney of Mille Lacs County

Endorsements

Results 

For this primary, the Minnesota Republican Party used a ranked-choice system. In its implementation, the system was mistrusted by voters who believed their first choices would be ignored for their second choices by party operatives. As a result, less than 10% of voters indicated a second choice. Only second choices were allowed.

The primary was held on September 17.

Democratic primary

Background 
Minnesota had been a Republican stronghold for decades, but it appeared that this Republican dominance was waning. The Republicans, divided between their reactionary and progressive factions, were more concerned with fighting among themselves than fighting the historically weak Minnesota Democratic Party. Having built something of a bench in the state, Minnesota Democrats were optimistic for 1912, as were outside observers. The Duluth Herald remarked that "there was never a time in Minnesota when the Democratic outlook was so bright."

Campaign 
Peter M. Ringdal was first mentioned for the governorship early in 1912, along with other Minnesota Democrats. He was known as a "true progressive" and one of the leaders of the progressive movement in Minnesota. One paper remarked that Ringdal was the Nestor of Minnesota progressives.

In March, prominent members of the Minnesota Democratic Party met to discuss the coming party convention and primary. In their meeting, they expressed that they believed Woodrow Wilson would receive the state's Democratic delegates. They also expressed confidence that then-Congressman Winfield Scott Hammond would be a good candidate for governor, though they would settle for Ringdal as a decent second choice.

In April, the Minneapolis Democratic Party endorsed Charles M. Andrist, a French language professor at the University of Minnesota. Andrist had not yet decided to run for governor, so the endorsement came as a surprise. On May 23, Andrist officially entered the race and unveiled his platform at a banquet in Minneapolis. His platform included some favorite progressive reforms of the day, like the popular election of Senators, campaign finance reforms, and allowing high schools to teach agricultural studies.

In late July, both Ringdal and Andrist officially paid the $50 filing fee. The Democratic organization in Minnesota asked Andrist to withdraw and support Ringdal to boost their chances of winning in the general election. This was part of a theme that year: the Democratic organization, sensing a weakly united Republican organization, was seeking to forward their strongest ticket without any primary challenges. However, their attempt to crowd out Andrist seems to have emboldened another professor, who told many that he had decided to run for governor: Peter M. Magnusson of St. Cloud. He never officially filed, however, and did not appear on primary ballots.As the campaign got underway, Ringdal positioned himself as a progressive Democrat. His platform supported popular reforms such as initiative and referendum, workmen's compensation, and a progressive tax structure. Though Andrist, Ringdal's only competitor, was understood to be a man of "high character," he remained an unknown entity whose platform was not well-known and who was without a particularly organized campaign.

On Labor Day, Ringdal was joined by progressive Republican James Peterson to speak at the Labor Day festivities in Duluth. He spoke at length in support of unions and of breaking up trusts.

In the final weeks of the campaign, observers accused Ringdal of being the candidate of the "Democrat machine," just as they had accused Governor Eberhart of being a product of the Republican "machine." It was noted that Ringdal campaigned little compared to Andrist and was seemingly expecting the nomination without having to campaign.

In the final days of the campaign, it was remarked by many local newspapers that Ringdal was the heavy favorite.

Endorsements

Candidates

Nominated 

 Peter M. Ringdal, chairman of the State Board of Control, former State Senator

Eliminated in Primary 

 Charles M. Andrist, professor at the University of Minnesota

Withdrawn 

 Peter M. Magnusson, professor, 1906 Democratic nominee for Secretary of State

Declined 

 Winfield Scott Hammond, United States Representative from Minnesota's second congressional district
 Thomas E. Cashman, State Senator
 William E. McEwen, former state labor commissioner
 Samuel G. Anderson, former State Representative
 J. B. Galarneault, banker
 James G. Armson
 Peter M. Kerst, former state bank examiner
 C. W. Stanton, judge
 T. J. Knox, former state railroad and warehouse commissioner
 E. P. Peterson, State Senator
 John Jenswold, lawyer (ran for Congress)
 Albert Pfaender, State Representative

Results 

The Democrats did not run a ranked-choice primary.

Results

See also
 List of Minnesota gubernatorial elections

References

External links
 http://www.sos.state.mn.us/home/index.asp?page=653
 http://www.sos.state.mn.us/home/index.asp?page=657

Minnesota
Gubernatorial
1912
November 1912 events in the United States